Morris "Moe" Koffman, OC (28 December 1928 – 28 March 2001) was a Canadian jazz saxophonist and flautist, as well as composer and arranger. During a career spanning from the 1950s to the 2000s, Koffman was one of Canada's most prolific musicians, working variously in clubs and sessions and releasing 30 albums. With his 1957 record Cool and Hot Sax on the New York-based Jubilee label, Koffman became one of the first Canadian jazz musicians to record a full-length album. Koffman was also a long-time member of Rob McConnell's Boss Brass.

Early life and education

Koffman was born in Toronto to Jewish immigrants from Poland. His parents operated a variety store. At the age of nine he began his musical studies in his native city,  studying violin. He studied with Gordon Delamont, and later attended the Toronto Conservatory of Music, now the Royal Conservatory of Music of Toronto, where he was a student of Samuel Dolin.

Background
Koffman dropped out of school when he found work performing in dance bands. In 1950, he moved to the United States, where he played with big bands including those of Sonny Dunham and Jimmy Dorsey. In 1955, he returned to Toronto where he formed a quartet and later a quintet. He recorded Swinging Shepherd Blues in 1957 which helped establish his reputation as a flautist. "Swinging Shepherd Blues" was a hit in the United States, reaching #38 on the Billboard pop chart and #23 on the UK Singles Chart.

Koffman was inspired by Rahsaan Roland Kirk to play multiple instruments at once; and had a modified set of straps to hold a tenor and an alto saxophone so that he could put forward incredible chords and improvise at the same time. One of the more famous session musicians in Toronto, he appeared in countless commercials, background music, and film and TV soundtracks. Most work on bass flute in Canadian soundtracks from 1950 to 1990 in Toronto sessions was done by Koffman on this rare instrument. Koffman was also an exponent of circular breathing techniques for his large volumes of sound, and joined fellow Canadian Maynard Ferguson and new age multi-instrumentalist musician Ron Allen in this talent.

During the 1970s, Koffman recorded several albums with arrangements of works by classical composers including Bach, Mozart and Vivaldi. The albums were released by GRT Canada and later by Universal. He also was a guest performer with a number of symphony orchestras across Canada.

He performed with Dizzy Gillespie and Peter Appleyard during the 1980s, as well as continuing to front the Moe Koffman Quintet. He often performed with Rob McConnell's Boss Brass. From 1956 to 1990, Koffman booked performers for George's Spaghetti House in Toronto, where he performed weekly. His compositions "Curried Soul" and "Koff Drops" have been used as the opening and closing themes respectively for the CBC radio show As It Happens since 1972.

He was appointed to the Order of Canada in 1993 and inducted into the Canadian Music Hall of Fame in 1997.

Career
By May 1970, Koffman's album, Moe's Curried Soul was out on the Revolver label. It entered the RPM100 album chart at #100 on the week ending May 9th. It peaked at #90 on the week ending June 13.

Koffman recorded a single with The Longo Brothers. It charted in the CanCon Top 10 Adult Contemporary chart for a number of weeks in 1984.

Illness and death
Koffman was diagnosed with non-Hodgkin's lymphoma in 2000, and died of cancer in Orangeville, Ontario in 2001 at the age of 72.

Legacy
In 2002, Moe Koffman was a MasterWorks honouree by the Audio-Visual Preservation Trust of Canada.
Some of Koffman's music for Duke Street Records was unreleased at the time of his death. Music for the Night was released and re-issued in 2007, and Devil's Brew was re-issued in 2009.

Discography (Selective)

LPs:
Cool and Hot Sax (1957) (Jubilee)
The Shepherd Swings Again (1958) (Jubilee)
Moe Koffman The Swinging Shepherd Plays for Teens (1962) (Ascot)
Tales of Koffman (1962) (UA)
The Moe Koffman Quartet (1963) (CTA)
Moe Koffman (1967) (Universal)
1967 (1967) (Just A Memory)
Moe Koffman Quartet (1967) (CBC/RCI)
Moe Koffman Goes Electric (1967) (Jubilee)
Turned On Moe Koffman (1968) (Jubilee)
Moe's Curried Soul with Doug Riley & Lenny Breau (1969) (Revolver)
Moe Koffman Plays Bach (1971) (GRT)
The Four Seasons (1972) (GRT)
Master Session (1974) (GRT)
Solar Explorations (1974) (GRT)
Swinging Shepherd (1975) (Universal)
Live at George's (1975) (GRT)
Jungle Man (1976) (GRT)
Museum Pieces (1977) (Janus)
Things Are Looking Up (1978) (GRT)
Back to Bach (1979) (Anthem)
Project (1980) (Universal)
If You Don't Know Me By Now... (1982) (Elektra)
Moe-Mentum (1986) (Universal)
One Moe Time (1986) (Duke)
Oop.Pop.A.Da featuring Dizzy Gillespie (1989) (Universal)
Moe Koffman Quintet Plays (1990) (Duke Street Records)
Music for the Night arranged by Doug Riley (1991) (Universal)
Collection (1993) (Universal)
Devil's Brew (1996) (Universal)

'With the Ron Collier Orchestra featuring Duke EllingtonNorth of the Border in Canada'' (Decca, 1967 [1969])

See also

Music of Canada
Canadian Music Hall of Fame

References

 Short biography by Scott Yanow

External links
CBC Digital Archives – Swingin' Moe Koffman
CanadianBands.com 

1928 births
2001 deaths
Canadian jazz composers
Male jazz composers
Canadian jazz flautists
Canadian Music Hall of Fame inductees
Deaths from cancer in Ontario
Deaths from non-Hodgkin lymphoma
Jewish Canadian musicians
Musicians from Toronto
Officers of the Order of Canada
The Royal Conservatory of Music alumni
20th-century Canadian composers
20th-century Canadian male musicians
Canadian jazz saxophonists
20th-century jazz composers
20th-century saxophonists
Anthem Records artists
Jubilee Records artists
Revolver Records (Canada) artists
20th-century flautists